Brian Earl Thompson (born August 28, 1959) is an American actor.  His career began with a small role in the 1984 film  The Terminator.  He played the villainous "Night Slasher" in the 1986 film Cobra. His first named role was on Werewolf, a horror series that ran during Fox's inaugural broadcasting year of 1987–1988. Thompson has played several characters in the Star Trek franchise—the most notable being the Klingon Lieutenant Klag in which he informed Riker that “Gagh is always best when served live”, the Alien Bounty Hunter on The X-Files, and Eddie Fiori on Kindred: The Embraced. In 2014, he produced, wrote and starred in the B movie parody The Extendables.

Early life
Thompson was born in Ellensburg, Washington, and raised in Longview. He attended Central Washington University, where he studied business management, played football, and appeared in many school productions. He then moved to California and earned a Master of Fine Arts from the University of California, Irvine. He initially trained and pursued a career in musical theater, performing at Riverside Civil Light Opera's production of "The King and I", Long Beach Civic Light Opera's "Bittersweet", and several other musicals. In 1982, he was a resident actor at the Colorado Shakespeare Festival.

Thompson's athletic build and unique facial structure were key in the initial roles he was offered. He has stated that it has occasionally been a double-edged sword when it comes to auditioning for roles, but it has provided him with consistent work. Thompson said, "If you're very physical in stature, you're gonna get hired for action movies. The star's always going to be chasing someone so they need an equal adversary. I'm never going to play a nebbish geek."

Career
Thompson was cast in The Terminator while still in school. He and Bill Paxton had minor roles as punk thugs.

He followed that up with  roles on Moonlighting, Otherworld, Street Hawk and Knight Rider before landing the role in the Sylvester Stallone vehicle, Cobra (1986). Although the film was critically panned, it was a commercial success. The New York Times wrote of Thompson's portrayal, "the archvillain, a character that is a cross between a James Bond fantasy villain such as Jaws and a raging psychopath, delivers a scorching monologue – a feat of linguistic sophistication that Cobra would have a hard time matching."

In 1993, Thompson landed another comedic role on the large ensemble series Key West which was filmed on location in the Florida Keys. The series lasted for 13 episodes. He played a "new-age sheriff", which Thompson stated was the favorite role of his career. The character uttered the introductory line, "I'm Sheriff Cody Jeremiah Jefferson. I'm a direct descendant of Wyatt Earp and the Lone Ranger. My personal heroes are Ted Nugent, Buddha and Davy Crockett. I am the last real lawman and the first peace officer of the 21st century."

The following year, Thompson began his tenure on The X-Files and followed that with roles in the science fiction-fantasy series Seven Days, Buffy the Vampire Slayer and Charmed. Between these, Thompson made dozens of appearances in other series and films. In 1996, he appeared in Dragonheart as Brok, the commander of the armies of David Thewlis' villainous king, Einon. The fantasy film, starring Dennis Quaid and Sean Connery, was a moderate success.

Thompson then returned to the big screen as lead antagonist Shao Kahn in the film adaptation of Mortal Kombat: Annihilation. The New York Times called it "colossal compendium of logic-defying martial arts, noisy, hyperactive special effects..." In 2014, Thompson released The Extendables, a film he produced, wrote, and starred in. A parody of movies like The Expendables, Thompson stated that it contained true-to-life instances from his own career. It was released via iTunes. In 2017 Thompson work in thriller indie film Trafficked with Ashley Judd, and in 2019 star in horror film Hoax alongside Adrienne Barbeau; in 2022 appeared in historical thriller film The Tragedy of Macbeth with Denzel Washington.

Star Trek
In 1989, Thompson landed his first Star Trek role on Star Trek: The Next Generation. His size worked against him at first, because the producers were originally looking to cast someone who could fit in a certain costume. He was able to convince them to give him a try: "That was the first of five auditions that I've had for Star Trek and they've hired me every time." Thompson played a Klingon in the episode "A Matter of Honor". In 1993 and 1996, he appeared in episodes of Star Trek: Deep Space Nine as different characters. In 1994, he appeared in the feature film Star Trek Generations.

In 2005, Thompson was cast as Admiral Valdore in three episodes of Star Trek: Enterprise. Thompson has since participated in Star Trek fandom, giving narrative DVD extras and appearing at conventions.

Personal life
Thompson is a stand up paddle surfing,  windsurfing and kitesurfing enthusiast and studies hapkido. He has two children, Daphne and Jordan.

Selected filmography

Film

Television

References

External links

 
 
 
 

1959 births
Living people
20th-century American male actors
21st-century American male actors
American hapkido practitioners
American male film actors
American male television actors
Male actors from Washington (state)
People from Ellensburg, Washington
People from Longview, Washington